Croisy-sur-Eure (literally Croisy on Eure) is a commune in the Eure department in northern France.

Population

Economy
The Gournay cheese Boursin brand is manufactured here.

See also
Communes of the Eure department

References

External links

Official web site

Communes of Eure